Psycharium natalense is a species of moth of the family Somabrachyidae. It is found in South Africa.

References

Endemic moths of South Africa
Zygaenoidea
Moths of Africa